In astronomy, an octaeteris (plural: octaeterides) is the period of eight solar years after which the moon phase occurs on the same day of the year plus one or two days.

This period is also in a very good synchronicity with five Venusian visibility cycles (the Venusian synodic period) and thirteen Venusian revolutions around the sun (Venusian sidereal period). This means, that if Venus is visible beside the moon, after eight years the two will be again close together near the same date of the calendar.

{| class="wikitable"
|+ Comparison of differing parts of the octaeteris
! Astronomical period
! Number in anoctaeteris
! Overall duration(Earth days)
|-
| Tropical year 
|align=right|  8     
|   2 921.93754
|-
| Synodic lunar month 
|align=right|  99     
|   2 923.528230 
|-
| Sidereal lunar month 
|align=right|  107     
|   2 923.417787
|-
| Venusian synodic period 
|align=right|  5     
|   2 919.6
|-
| Venusian sidereal period
|align=right|  13     
|   2 921.07595
|}

The octaeteris, also known as oktaeteris, was noted by Cleostratus in ancient Greece as a  day cycle. The octaeteris is the calendar used for the Olympic games; if one Olympiad was 50 months long, the next would be 49 lunar months long. This octaeteris calendar is used for the Olympic dial of the Antikythera mechanism, to determine the time of the Olympic games and other Greek festivities.

The 8 year short lunisolar cycle was probably known to many ancient cultures. The mathematical proportions of the octaeteris cycles were  The Three Kings panel also contains more accurate ratios, ratios related to other planets, and apparent astronomical symbolism.

See also 
Metonic cycle
 Eclipse cycle

References 
 

Ancient Greek astronomy
Calendars
Time in astronomy